Wiesław Jan Maniak (22 May 1938 – 28 May 1982) was a Polish athlete who mainly competed in the 100 m sprint.

He competed for Poland at the 1964 Summer Olympics held in Tokyo, Japan where he won the silver medal in the men's 4 x 100 metre relay with his teammates Andrzej Zieliński, Marian Foik and Marian Dudziak.

References
 sports-reference

1938 births
1982 deaths
Polish male sprinters
Olympic silver medalists for Poland
Athletes (track and field) at the 1964 Summer Olympics
Athletes (track and field) at the 1968 Summer Olympics
Olympic athletes of Poland
Sportspeople from Lviv
People from Lwów Voivodeship
European Athletics Championships medalists
Medalists at the 1964 Summer Olympics
Olympic silver medalists in athletics (track and field)
Legia Warsaw athletes
Skra Warszawa athletes
20th-century Polish people